Barford is a village and civil parish in the English county of Norfolk, situated some 4 miles (6 km) north of Wymondham and 8 miles (13 km) west of Norwich.

The villages name derives from 'bere-ford' meaning 'barley ford'.

The civil parish has an area of 4.38 km2 and in the 2001 census had a population of 508 in 201 households, the population increasing to 547 at the 2011 census. For the purposes of local government, the parish falls within the district of South Norfolk.

War Memorial
Barford's War Memorial is a stone cross in St. Botolph's Churchyard, it holds the following names for the First World War:
 Corporal Harry Melton (1895-1916), 7th Battalion, Middlesex Regiment
 Lance-Corporal Robert J. Fisher (1892-1915), 1st Battalion, Coldstream Guards
 Lance-Corporal John M. Timbers (1879-1916), 2nd Battalion, Rifle Brigade (The Prince Consort's Own)
 Lance-Corporal Horace W. Fox (1885-1916), 10th Battalion, Yorkshire Regiment
 Private Henry J. Timbers (1869-1919), Royal Defence Corps
 Private E. Arthur Thrower (d.1917), 20th Battalion, Royal Fusiliers
 Private Charles E. Fisher (1895-1914), 1st Battalion, Royal Norfolk Regiment
 Private Eric I. Cole (1894-1916), 1st Battalion, Northamptonshire Regiment
 Harry Sutton

References

 Ordnance Survey (1999). OS Explorer Map 237 - Norwich. .
 Office for National Statistics & Norfolk County Council (2001). Census population and household counts for unparished urban areas and all parishes. Retrieved 2 December 2005.

External links
 
 Information from Genuki Norfolk on Barford
 
 http://kepn.nottingham.ac.uk/map/place/Norfolk/Barford

Villages in Norfolk
Civil parishes in Norfolk